The Fourth Encirclement Campaign is an abbreviated name used for several different encirclement campaigns launched by the Nationalist Government with the goal of destroying the developing Chinese Red Army and its communist bases. The battles took place in several separate locations in China during the early stage of Chinese Civil War, between the late 1920s to mid-1930s. These are:

 Fourth Encirclement Campaign against Jiangxi Soviet, January to March 22, 1933
 Fourth Encirclement Campaign against Hubei-Henan-Anhui Soviet, July 1932 to October 12, 1932
 Fourth Encirclement Campaign against Honghu Soviet - 2nd stage of the Encirclement Campaign against Hunan-Western Hubei Soviet